Emergency Act 19 is a satirical 2002 South Korean film about a government act that prohibits popular music, passed in response to a number of musicians being elected to government elsewhere in the world. It is notable for the numerous K-pop stars that make appearances in the film. The film's English title is sometimes given as Emergency Measure 19 or Emergency 19.

Plot 
Troubled by the growing worldwide trend of pop singers being elected as politicians, the President of South Korea orders his Chief Secretary to invoke "Emergency Act 19". This new law criminalizes all pop singers, and the army is deployed on the streets of Seoul to round them up. One pop star, Hong Kyung-min, is arrested while performing a concert, but his angry fans mob the soldiers as they try to take him away. The Chief Secretary's teenage daughter, Min-ji, is amongst the fans, and leading her idol to safety gives him her phone number. Kyung-min finally makes a getaway with his friend and fellow pop star, Kim Jang-hoon.

Once Jang-hoon and Kyung-min become fully aware of the situation, they contact Min-ji who is able to hide the two singers in a secret location. The Chief Secretary finds out that his daughter is working against him, and when she refuses to give them up he has false news reports created, accusing the singers of sexually assaulting minors. Meanwhile, more pop stars are rounded up by the authorities who are now aided by another singer, Ju Yeong-hun, who decides to betray his friends in order to save himself.

Angered by their tarnished reputations, Jang-hoon and Kyung-min acquire a gun from a shady weapons dealer, and with Min-ji's help they are able to take the Chief Secretary and his staff hostage. They take their captives to the park, where Min-ji has organized a mass demonstration with her friends and other music fans. The army arrive on the scene and engage the demonstrators in conflict, finally capturing Jang-hoon and Kyung-min. The Chief Secretary is able to walk free in all the chaos, but he is appalled by the violence and orders the fighting to stop, convincing the President to repeal the emergency act and restoring peace.

Cast 
 Kim Jang-hoon as himself
 Hong Kyung-min as himself
 Gong Hyo-jin as Min-ji
 Noh Joo-hyun as the Chief Secretary and Min-ji's father
 Ju Yeong-hun as himself

List of cameos 
Besides the main cast, there are a number of actors and K-pop singers and groups who make cameos in the film as themselves. They are:
 Kim Sung-oh as soldier 2 at vinyl house
 Baby V.O.X.
 Brown Eyes
 Can
 Chakra
 Click-B
 Fin.K.L
 Harisu
 Kangta
 Koyote
 NRG
 Shinhwa
 UN
Psy

Release 
Emergency Act 19 was released in South Korea on July 19, 2002, and received a total of 41,034 admissions in Seoul.

References

External links 
 
 
 Emergency Act 19 review at Cinespot

2002 films
2000s Korean-language films
2000s satirical films
2002 black comedy films
South Korean political satire films
South Korean black comedy films
K-pop films
Films set in Seoul
Films about singers
Films about politicians
2000s South Korean films